The PINT Football Club, nicknamed, Greenants, is a member club of the Northern Territory Football League who first entered 2022/23 NTFL season.
The club is based in the Darwin suburb of Marrara.

Club achievements

Men's Competetion 
Premierships:
5 (A-grade), 2 (B-grade)

Runners Up:
11 (A-grade), 2 (B-grade)

Women's Competition 
Premierships: 2

Runners Up: 0

History
As the Northern Territory Football Association began, a few blokes decided that the P.I.N.T (Postal Institute of the Northern Territory) Club could enter a team in the new football competition. The instigators of this decision were Jeff Watkins, Marty Barlow, Iain Frazier, Paul Abbott, Ted Cocker and Bob White.

PINT play in green jumpers with gold vertical stripes over the years different styles of jumpers have been adopted such as green jumpers with a white and gold V and white and green with a gold sash.

It is reported that PINT was known as the PINT Panthers between 1982 and 1997, however, some say that only the media dubbed the PINT Football Club ‘the Panthers’. Nonetheless, since 1997, PINT has been known as the Greenants.

PINT won five A-grade premierships and have finished runner-up eight times. They participated in the first ever NTFA Grand Final when they lost to Katherine. The following year they lost in the Grand Final to Banks. PINT hold the record for the biggest losing margin in an NTFA/TEAFA Grand Final. In 1985/86, PINT lost the Grand Final against Banks by an amazing 104 points. They won their first ‘flag’ one year later.

Club song

External links

Official Facebook
AFL Northern Territory

References 

Sport in Darwin, Northern Territory
Australian rules football clubs in the Northern Territory
1982 establishments in Australia
Australian rules football clubs established in 1982